The Midway Plaisance, known locally as the Midway, is a public park on the South Side of Chicago, Illinois.  It is one mile long by 220 yards wide and extends along 59th and 60th streets, joining Washington Park at its west end and Jackson Park at its east end. It divides the Hyde Park community area to the north from the Woodlawn community area to the south.  Near Lake Michigan, the Midway is about 6 miles (10 km) south of the downtown "Loop". The University of Chicago was founded just north of the park, and university buildings now front the Midway to the south, as well.

The park came to prominence when the Midway was first laid-out to host popular amusements at the World's Columbian Exposition in 1893, later lending its name, "midway", to areas at county and state fairs and amusement parks with sideshows.  Landscaped with long vistas and avenues of trees at the start of the 20th century, the Midway in part followed the vision of its designer Frederick Law Olmsted, one of the creators of New York City's Central Park, but without his proposed feature of a Venetian canal down the Midway's center linking the lagoon systems of Jackson and Washington parks.  Instead, the Midway is landscaped with a fosse, lawn covered depression, where the canal would have been, although in the winter parts of the grounds are turned over for ice skating.

Later designers and artists added (or sought to add) their vision to the Midway. A pet project of the University of Chicago and almost a part of its campus, it has remained essentially a green area.

Origin of the name

The word "plaisance" is both the French spelling of and a quaint obsolete spelling for "pleasance", itself an obscure word in this context meaning "a pleasure ground laid out with shady walks, trees and shrubs, statuary, and ornamental water".

The South Park Commission plan

The Midway Plaisance began as a vision in the 1850s of Paul Cornell, a land developer, to turn an undeveloped stretch of infertile land south of Chicago into an urban lakeside retreat for middle- and upper-class residents seeking to escape city life. The area was a lakefront marsh ecosystem.

In 1869, Cornell and his South Park Commission were granted the right to set up a complex of parks and boulevards that would include Washington Park to the west, Jackson Park to the east on the lakeshore, and the Midway Plaisance as a system of paths and waterways connecting the two (see Encyclopedia of Chicago Map). The firm of Olmsted, Vaux, and Co., famous for creating New York City's Central Park, was hired to design the urban oasis. Part of their plan was that the Midway would function as "a magnificent chain of lakes", allowing boaters to go from the ponds to be built in Washington Park to the lagoons to be developed in Jackson Park and through the lagoons to Lake Michigan.

The South Park Commission office, where all the detailed plans were stored, was burned in the Great Chicago Fire of 1871. The expense of rebuilding the city eliminated the funds to cover expenditures that the plans would have entailed, and the South Park area remained largely in its natural swampy state.

World's Columbian Exposition
The World's Columbian Exposition of 1893 was held in the underdeveloped parts of the South Park. The worldwide celebration of  Columbus' transfer of "the torch of civilization to the New World" in 1492 was one of the most successful and influential of world's fairs.  It covered over 600 acres (2.4 km2) and attracted exhibitors and visitors from all over the world.

For the Exposition, the mile-long Midway Plaisance, running from the eastern edge of Washington Park on Cottage Grove Avenue to the western edge of Jackson Park on Stony Island Avenue, was turned over to the theatrical entrepreneur Sol Bloom, a protégé of Chicago mayor Carter Harrison, Sr. It became a grand mix of fakes, hokum, and the genuinely educational and introduced the "hootchy-cootchy" version of the belly dance in the "Street in Cairo" amusement; it was the most popular, with 2.25 million admissions. George Washington Gale Ferris Jr.'s original Ferris Wheel carried over 1.5 million passengers. The Midway's money-making concessions and sideshows made over $4 million in 1893 dollars, and it was the more memorable portion of the Exposition for many visitors. The Midway also featured more scholarly exhibits which were overseen by Frederic Ward Putnam,  head  of Harvard University’s  Peabody Museum of Archaeology and Ethnology, and ethnologist Otis Tufton Mason of the Smithsonian Institution.

In the years after the Exposition closed, "midway" came to be used in the United States to signify the area for amusements at a county or state fair, circus, or amusement park.

The Midway Plaisance led visitors from the Midway Plaisance to the Women's Building and then to the White City.

University of Chicago

Following the Exposition, the Midway Plaisance was returned to a park setting, under the renewed plans of Frederick Law Olmsted. Over the ensuing decades, the Midway gradually came to be encompassed by the University of Chicago, which expanded in 1926 to be located on either side of it. Today the Midway sits between the original main campus to the north and the professional graduate schools the University of Chicago Law School, the Harris School of Public Policy, the Crown Family School of Social Work, Policy, and Practice, and the Graham School of Continuing Liberal and Professional Studies, as well as, the University of Chicago Press to the south.

Later designers and artists, including Lorado Taft, and Eero Saarinen added or sought to add their vision to the Midway. A statue of the father of modern taxonomy, Carl Linnaeus, and an equestrian statue by sculptor Albin Polasek of the Knight of Blanik, a legendary Czech savior who emerges from Blaník mountain in his nation's hour of need, grace the Midway.

It has remained essentially a green area, a public resource subject to much speculation, and various periodic plans of redevelopment. The sunken panels, home now to soccer players and ice skating and sports facility, the cross-street "bridges", and the east–west lines of trees, pay homage to Olmsted's vision.

In 1999, a new master plan for the Midway Plaisance done by OLIN, a landscape architecture firm, was unveiled by the University of Chicago and the Chicago Park District.

The proximity of the Midway to the university gave the school's early football teams, the Maroons, a second nickname, "Monsters of the Midway", a name later applied to the Chicago Bears when the University of Chicago dropped its football program. The program has since been reinstated, and the Maroons play at Stagg Field on 55th street, half a mile north of the midway.

References

The Midway, Lorado Taft's Boulevard of Broken Dreams, O'Connor, Jerome, Chicago Tribune, October 25, 1965.

External links
Chicago Park District - Midway Plaisance Park official website
Midway Plaisance Park  webpage
Chicago's Midway Plaisance Walking Tour website
Midway Plaisance Plan at the University of Chicago

Parks in Chicago
Historic districts in Chicago
World's Columbian Exposition
South Side, Chicago
Streets in Chicago
Parks on the National Register of Historic Places in Chicago
Urban public parks
University of Chicago
World's fair sites in Illinois
1871 establishments in Illinois